Gézoncourt is a commune in the Meurthe-et-Moselle department of northeastern France. It has a population of 178 (2018) and is between the towns of Metz and Nancy. Its current mayor is Bernard Burté, re-elected in 2020.

See also
Communes of the Meurthe-et-Moselle department
Parc naturel régional de Lorraine

References

Communes of Meurthe-et-Moselle